Bodhu Boron is a ritual performed to welcome the bride  to the groom's home. 

The women of the house pour water on the ground beneath their vehicle when they alight. Then the bride stands on a wooden square structure "Jalchouki". Most often the groom's elder brother's wife holds a plate containing "Durba", lac dye and milk. Durba is spread on bride's forehead as a blessing. A pot full of rice is placed in front of the bride's feet which is gently kicked by her. It symbolizes the wish and belief of having so much rice that it can even be kicked off. Then the bride puts her feet on a plate of Alta (a traditional cosmetic used to color feet). Having imprinted the soles of her feet thus, she is taken into the house. The elders of the house bless the newly weds.

This tradition varies to a little extent from one place to another. In many places the bride's (bodhu's) feet are not let to touch ground. Her brother or sisters-in-law take her from the Palki (chariot) to the house by carrying her on the lap. This is a sign of love and veneration towards the bride. Alta is also used as a replacement of milk.

Indian wedding traditions